Henry Elmer "Buddy" Maracle (September 8, 1904 – June 20, 1958) was a Canadian professional ice hockey player who played eleven games in the National Hockey League with the New York Rangers during the 1930–31 season. Born in Ayr, Ontario, but grew up in Haileybury, Ontario. A member of the Mohawk tribe, Maracle was the first full-blooded First Nations hockey player in the National Hockey League at the time of his recall to the New York Rangers in March 1931.

Early life
Research has suggested that Maracle's family heritage draws from the Oneida Mohawks. His family picked up and moved from the reserve at Six Nations of the Grand River to Ayr early in the 20th century. Maracle was born in Ayr in 1904 to Albert Maracle and Elsie Hill. After moving to Haileybury, Maracle took up the game of hockey at the high school level.

Career
Maracle's hockey career lasted 20 years, and he is known to have suited up for teams across North America, including the North Bay Trappers of the Northern Ontario Hockey Association, Toronto Industrial of the TIHL, the Springfield Indians of the Canadian–American Hockey League (Can-Am), the New York Rangers of the National Hockey League, the Bronx Tigers of the Can-Am, the New Haven Eagles of the Can-Am, the Philadelphia Arrows of the Can-Am, the Tulsa Oilers of the American Hockey Association, and the Detroit Pontiacs of the Michigan–Ontario Hockey League.

Maracle spent six seasons in Springfield, and eventually became the club's captain. He was called up to the NHL by the New York Rangers half-way through the 1930-31 season, and played 15 games for the team.

Personal
Maracle married Josephine Hardman. He died in Dallas, Texas in 1958 of complications from anemia. He had been a truck driver for a produce company at the time of his death.

Legacy
The NHL has not recognized Maracle's place in League history despite mounting evidence and research published in 2018 by multiple authors, including from The Ayr News and The Hockey News. Instead the focus has been to accept Fred Sasakmoose's 1953 debut with the Chicago Blackhawks as the league's first indigenous player representation in a regular season game. In a competing claim, a third player, Paul Jacobs, is also alleged to have been the first indigenous player when he supposedly played a single game for the Toronto Arenas in the NHL in 1918, the league's second season. However, newspaper records suggest he may have only practiced with the team in the pre-season before heading back to Quebec.

In 2018, the Rangers donated a pair of modern-day jerseys emblazoned with Maracle’s name and number 14 to rinks in Ayr and at Six Nations.

In 2020, the Ontario Sports Hall of Fame notified The Ayr News that Maracle was being considered for induction.

Career statistics

Regular season and playoffs

References

External links
 

1904 births
1958 deaths
Bronx Tigers players
Canadian expatriate ice hockey players in the United States
Canadian ice hockey left wingers
Canadian Mohawk people
First Nations sportspeople
Ice hockey people from Ontario
New Haven Eagles players
New York Rangers players
People from Temiskaming Shores
Philadelphia Arrows players
Springfield Indians players
Tulsa Oilers (AHA) players